Macroprotodon abubakeri is a species of snake in the family Colubridae. It is one of four species in the genus Macroprotodon.

Etymology
The specific name, abubakeri, is in honor of Algerian naturalist Aboubakeur Sid-Ahmed.

Geographic range
M. abubakeri is found in Algeria, Morocco, and possibly Spain.

Habitat
The natural habitat of M. abubakeri is Mediterranean-type shrubby vegetation.

Conservation status
M. abubakeri is threatened by habitat loss.

References

Further reading
Wade E (2001). "Review of the False Smooth Snake Genus Macroprotodon (Serpentes, Colubridae) in Algeria with a Description of a New Species". Bull. Nat. Hist. Mus. London (Zool.) 67 (1): 85–107. (Macroprotodon abubakeri, new species, p. 95).

Macroprotodon
Reptiles described in 2001
Taxonomy articles created by Polbot
Reptiles of North Africa